Ivan Vladimirovich Shpakov (born 8 June 1986) is a Russian former professional footballer.

Club career
He made his professional debut in the Russian Second Division in 2002 for FC Mostransgaz Gazoprovod. He played 3 games in the UEFA Cup 2005–06 qualification rounds for FC Krylia Sovetov Samara.

In June 2009 he was signed by FK Ventspils. In August 2010 he left the team, becoming a free agent after a very successful season with the club.

References

1986 births
Living people
People from Kingisepp
Russian footballers
Russian Premier League players
PFC Krylia Sovetov Samara players
FC Shinnik Yaroslavl players
FK Ventspils players
Russian expatriate footballers
Expatriate footballers in Latvia
Russian expatriate sportspeople in Latvia
FC Zhemchuzhina Sochi players
FC Mostransgaz Gazoprovod players
FC Fakel Voronezh players
Association football forwards
FC Novokuznetsk players
FC Nosta Novotroitsk players
Sportspeople from Leningrad Oblast